Peter B. Dews (1922–2012) was an American psychologist and pharmacologist. He is credited as the principal founder of the discipline of behavioral pharmacology.

References 

20th-century American psychologists
American pharmacologists
1922 births
2012 deaths